Burnaby Mountain, elev. , is a low, forested mountain in the city of Burnaby, British Columbia, overlooking the upper arms of Burrard Inlet. It is the location of Simon Fraser University Burnaby Campus, the Discovery Park research community, and the System Control Tower of BC Hydro and a residential neighbourhood with retail shops development called UniverCity. In November 1995, the Province of British Columbia and Simon Fraser University reached an agreement to transfer 330 hectares of university land to the City of Burnaby for inclusion into Burnaby Mountain Conservation Area.

Wildlife 
In spite of residential development on its western slope and continuing deforestation due to condominium construction around SFU, the mountain still has wildlife remaining such as deer, raccoons, coyotes customarily roaming local streets. A few black bears, sometimes mothers with cubs, pay occasional visits to the forest trails—and even the backyards of Westridge residents. Common wild birds include several types of woodpeckers, northern flickers, Steller's jays, great blue herons, barred owls, and great horned owls. Sightings of bald eagles over the mountain's eastern forest are not uncommon.

Climate

Attractions 

Burnaby Mountain has a viewpoint facing west at Centennial Park. The yearly Celebration of Light fireworks festival on English Bay west of downtown Vancouver can be seen from the park and attracts an audience on the parks' westward-facing lawns.

The mountain is known for its mountain biking trails and obstacles. There are easy trails like Sidebandit, challenging rides (Mel's) and two hard, steep runs (Nicoles, Gearjammer).

Due to its relatively high elevation, snow will often fall on the higher levels of Burnaby Mountain while rain falls in the surrounding cities. Tobogganing is a popular pastime at Centennial Park on winter days with snow.

The park is also home to a collection of Ainu totem pole-like carvings which commemorate the goodwill between Burnaby and its sister city, Kushiro, Japan, and a fairly large formal rose garden

References

External links 
 
 
 List of Burnaby Mountain Bike Trails (including video of each trail)
 Route description for the Burnaby Mountain hiking trails

Mountains of the Lower Mainland
Landforms of Vancouver
Tourist attractions in Burnaby